Earl George Godding (born 6 January 1934) is a Welsh former professional footballer who played as a goalkeeper. He made appearances in the English Football League with Wrexham and Workington.

References

1934 births
Living people
Welsh footballers
Association football goalkeepers
Caergwrle F.C. players
Wrexham A.F.C. players
Workington A.F.C. players
Dolgellau F.C. players
English Football League players
Dolgellau Athletic A.F.C players